The first season of the American comedy television series Vice Principals, created by Danny McBride and Jody Hill.

Cast

Main 
 Danny McBride as Neal Grmby
 Walton Goggins as Lee Russell
 Kimberly Hébert Gregory as Dr. Belinda Brown
 Georgia King as Amanda Snodgrass
 Sheaun McKinney as Dayshawn
 Busy Philipps as Gale Liptrapp
 Shea Whigham as Ray Liptrapp

Recurring 
 Maya G. Love as Janelle Gamby
 Edi Patterson as Jen Abbott
 Ashley Spillers as Janice Swift
 Susan Park as Christine Russell
 Mike O'Gorman as Bill Hayden
 Madelyn Cline as Taylor Watts
 James M. Connor as Martin Seychelles
 Robin Bartlett as Octavia LeBlanc
 Brian Howe as Jeremy Haas
 RJ Cyler as Luke Brown
 Brian Tyree Henry as Dascious Brown

Episodes

References

2016 American television seasons